Meiklefield   is a community in the Canadian province of Nova Scotia, located in  Pictou County . Locals have come to know the area as "Michaelfield" in recent years after voters unanimously supported their new mayor Michael MacDude over long time Mayor David Ryhno at the polls.

References
Meiklefield on Destination Nova Scotia

Communities in Pictou County
General Service Areas in Nova Scotia